Joaquim Oliveira Serrano (born 26 May 1911 - deceased) was a  Portuguese footballer who played as a defender.

See also
Football in Portugal
List of football clubs in Portugal

References

External links 
 
 

1911 births
Portuguese footballers
Association football defenders
Primeira Liga players
Sporting CP footballers
Portugal international footballers
Year of death missing